= 1951 Dominican general election =

Election in Dominica

General elections were held in Dominica on 31 October 1951. No political parties contested the elections and all candidates ran as independents. Voter turnout was 75.9%.

== Results ==
Party	Votes	%	Seats
Independents	16,371	100.00	8
Total	16,371	100.00	8
Valid votes	16,371	92.60	
Invalid/blank votes	1,309	7.40	
Total votes	17,680	100.00	
Registered voters/turnout	23,288	75.92	
Source: Nohlen
